Crème Ninon is a soup with a base of a heavy stock purée of green peas and dry champagne. It is flavoured with lemon and some dry sherry, as well as salt and pepper. Just before serving it is topped with some whipped cream and champagne.

See also
 List of soups

External links
 Recipe for Crème Ninon from Tasteline

Soups
Foods with alcoholic drinks